Deselection in the UK Labour Party is the process by which support for an MP is withdrawn by their local party meaning that the MP is unable to stand in a forthcoming general election with the support of the party.

Rules governing deselection 
Labour Party rules specify that MPs will face a "trigger ballot" procedure where each branch of the Constituency Labour Party (CLP) and each affiliate (trade union and socialist society) branch will have a simple majority vote on whether they wish their sitting MP to automatically stand again in the next general election, or whether they wish to have a full selection process.

If one third or more of party or affiliate branches vote for a full selection then the sitting MP will face a vote of all party members to decide whether they want their existing MP, or an alternative candidate to represent them at the next election.

History of deselection rules

Before 1970 
Before 1970 the process for reconsidering support for a sitting MP required three Constituency General Committee (GC) meetings to be called for the purpose of considering whether to support the MP, followed by a meeting of affiliates to the CLP where affiliate GC delegates were mandated to vote a certain way. If the local party sought to remove their MP the MP could then appeal this decision to the NEC. 

The NEC was at this time controlled by the right of the Labour Party and almost invariably sided with the sitting MP and against the Constituency Party. The NEC threatened to disband some CLPs which sought to change their Labour MP.

1970–1979 
The rules governing reselection were amended at Labour Party Conference in 1970 making it marginally less difficult to challenge a sitting MP. Dropping the required number of GC meetings from three to two and removing the mandating of affiliate GC delegates. 

The Campaign for Labour Party Democracy (CLPD), founded in 1973, was set up by left wing Labour activists to organise for greater democratic representation within the Labour Party. CLPD spent the next six years organising to seek to win a rule change at Labour Party Conference to create an automatic reselection procedure for each sitting Labour MP.  

At Labour Party Conference in 1974 the NEC reported that they had conducted a review of the rules and concluded that no changes were required. Ken Coates moved a motion to seek automatic selection at this conference which was defeated. Although CLPs submitted motions in 1975 and 1976 calling for an automatic selection procedure to be introduced these were ruled out of order on the grounds that they breached the 'three year rule'.  

67 CLPs submitted motions calling for automatic reselection to the 1977 conference. These motions were ruled out of order on the grounds that they breached the '1968 rule' However, Ian Mikardo announced on behalf of the NEC that "We shall put down at next year's Annual Conference all the amendments to the constitution necessary to provide automatic reselection in the way and in the sense that the sponsors of those sixty-odd resolutions want. I do not think there is the least chance of the Executive reneging on that undertaking." 

At Labour Party Conference in 1978 the NEC broke this commitment and did not bring forward the proposal for automatic reselection. CLPD organised for a motion on automatic reselection to be voted on. The Amalgamated Engineering Union (AUEW) delegates had democratically agreed to support the CLPD motion however when it came to the vote the AUEW's then president, Hugh Scanlon, voted against the CLPD motion, and it was narrowly defeated. Following an intensive 12-month organising campaign by CLPD, at Labour Party Conference in 1979 a CLPD motion for automatic reselection was passed. 

Gavin Strang MP suggested that one of the consequences of the introduction of mandatory reselection was that MPs spent more time in their constituencies, saying "it's far more the normal thing now to have an office in the constituency, to employ someone there, and to live in the constituency. Reselection has turned MPs into better campaigners for the local party."

1979–present 
In 1990 Neil Kinnock, then leader of the Labour Party, scrapped mandatory reselection, replacing it with a system of trigger ballots.

Changes to make deselection of Labour MPs easier, by lowering the number of branches that have to vote to trigger a contest from 50% to 33%, were passed by a large majority at Labour's 2018 Party Conference. However, the proposal made by a number of CLPs for open selections was not permitted to go to a vote, leading to criticism from Momentum who described the changes as "meager" with "key proposals being watered down".

No Labour MPs were deselected during the leadership of Ed Miliband or the leadership of Jeremy Corbyn.

In February 2022, it was reported that Jeremy Corbyn was close to being deselected. In October 2022, Sam Tarry became the first MP to be deselected since 2010. He was beaten by leader of Redbridge London Borough Council Jas Athwal. Tarry questioned the integrity of the election, citing the electronic voting system that was used to count the votes.

List of deselected Labour MPs 

This list does not include MPs who successfully overturned a vote to deselect them at the NEC.

Further reading 

 Labour Party Rulebook 2019
 Blackburn, Tom. (2017) In Defence of Party Democracy
Osland, David. (2016) How to Select or Reselect Your MP: 2016 Remix  
 Leys, Colin. Coates, David & Panitch, Leo (1997) The End of Parliamentary Socialism: From New Left to New Labour 
 Shaw, Eric (1988) Discipline and Discord: Politics of Managerial Control in the Labour Party, 1951-86 
Seyd, Patrick. (1987) The Rise and Fall of the Labour Left  
 Wainwright, Hilary. (1987) Labour: A Tale of Two Parties 
Seyd, Patrick. (1986) The Labour Left PhD Volume 1 & Volume 2
Mullin, Chris. (1981) How to Reselect Your Member of Parliament

References

See also 

 Campaign for Labour Party Democracy

Labour Party (UK)
Politics of the United Kingdom